We Are for the Dark is a quotation from the final act of Shakespeare's Antony and Cleopatra, which was used by various writers as the title for their own works.

 We Are for the Dark {1944) by Dorothy Eden
 We Are for the Dark: Six Ghost Stories (1951) by Elizabeth Jane Howard and Robert Aickman
 We Are For The Dark (1987) by Robert Silverberg
We Are for the Dark: The Collected Stories [of Silverberg] Volume 7 (2012)